Robinsons Landing Marina is located in Comanche County, Oklahoma within the continental United States. Lake Lawtonka provides the fresh water source for the waterfront marina situated in the north shoreline boundaries of the Lawtonka reservoir.

The public marina borders the Wichita Mountains and Wichita Mountains Wildlife Refuge with the lofty neighbor of Mount Scott in the distance. The lake marina has a census-designated place or housing estate bearing north known as Lawtonka Acres.

The Lawtonka recreation area and north shore marina are public property of the City of Lawton Lakes Division.

Pictorial Biography

Climate
According to the Köppen climate classification system, Wichita Mountains region has a humid subtropical climate, with a climate map reference as Cfa.

See also
 Cache Creek
 Charon Gardens Wilderness Area
 Elmer Thomas Lake
 Ketch Ranch House
 Lake Jed Johnson
 Mount Pinchot
 Quanah Parker Lake

References

Reading Bibliography

External links
 
 
 
 
  

Marinas in Oklahoma
Buildings and structures in Comanche County, Oklahoma